The ocellate spot skate (Okamejei kenojei), also known as the spiny rasp skate or swarthy skate, is a species of skate in the family Rajidae and is commonly found in the north-western Pacific Ocean. O. kenojei is a bottom-feeding carnivore that consumes mainly shrimp, fishes, and crabs. Its diet also includes small quantities of amphipods, mysids, cephalopods, euphausiids, copepods, isopods, and polychaetes.

References 

ocellate spot skate
Fish of Korea
Fish of East Asia
Taxa named by Johannes Peter Müller
Taxa named by Friedrich Gustav Jakob Henle
ocellate spot skate